Parade of the Reservists (Parada rezerwistów) is a 1934 Polish film directed by Michał Waszyński.

Cast
Adolf Dymsza ...  The Chief 
Jerzy Kobusz   
Józef Kondrat ...  The Private 
Tola Mankiewiczówna ...  Barbara 
Stanisław Sielański ...  The Waiter 
Władysław Walter ...  The Corporal

External links 
 

1934 films
1930s Polish-language films
Polish black-and-white films
Films directed by Michał Waszyński